The Baker House in Sea Ranch, California was listed on the National Register of Historic Places in 2018.
It was designed by architect William Turnbull Jr. and was built in 1968.

Per a 2019 article in design magazine Dwell, it is the only "Blinker Barn" that is listed on the National Register, and was listed for sale in 2019 at $1,325,000.

Its 1968 redwood interior was crafted by Matthew Silvia.  It was expanded to the rear in 2010 by addition of a structure connected by a catwalk.

See also
Condominium 1, also in Sea Ranch and NRHP-listed

References

National Register of Historic Places in Sonoma County, California
Houses completed in 1968
1968 establishments in California